The state of Andhra Pradesh has 26 districts spread across three cultural regions — Uttarandhra, Coastal Andhra and Rayalaseema. Uttarandhra consists of Srikakulam, Vizianagaram, Parvathipuram Manyam, Alluri Sitharama Raju, Visakhapatnam and Anakapalli districts. Coastal Andhra comprises Kakinada, Dr. B. R. Ambedkar Konaseema, East Godavari, West Godavari, Eluru, Krishna, NTR, Guntur, Palnadu, Bapatla, Prakasam and SPSR Nellore districts. Rayalaseema consists of Kurnool, Nandyal, Anantapur, Sri Sathya Sai, YSR, Annamayya, Tirupati and Chittoor districts. 

Visakhapatnam is the smallest district in area while Prakasam is the largest. Nellore is the most populous whereas Parvathipuram Manyam is the least populous district. The districts are further divided into two or more revenue divisions and mandals for administrative purposes.

History 
At the time of Independence the present day Andhra Pradesh was a part of the Madras State. The telugu speaking dominant regions Kosta Andhra and Rayalaseema were separated from Madras State to form Andhra State in 1953.

As a result of the 1956 States Reorganisation Act, the state's boundaries were re-organized following linguistic lines. On 1 November 1956, the Andhra State and the Telangana region of the Hyderabad State were merged to form the Andhra Pradesh which is retrospectively referred to as United Andhra Pradesh. 

During it's formation in 1953 as Andhra State, it consisted of 11 districts which are Anantapur, Chittoor, East Godavari, Guntur, Kadapa, Krishna, Kurnool, Nellore, Srikakulam, Visakhapatnam and West Godavari.

Later in 1956 when the Telangana region was added to the Andhra State it combinedly consisted of 21 district's, where 10 other district's belonged to the Telangana region. In the year 1959,  Bhadrachalam and Nuguru Venkatapuram taluks of East Godavari district, which are on the other side of the Godavari River, were merged into Khammam district on grounds of geographical contiguity and administrative viability. Similarly Aswaraopeta part of West Godavari District was added to Khammam district and Munagala taluk belonging to Krishna district was added to Nalgonda district in the same year.

The Prakasam district was later carved out of the parts of Guntur, Nellore and Kurnool district's in 1970. Whereas Vizianagaram district was carved out of the parts of Visakhapatnam and Srikakulam district's in 1979 taking the total to 23.

After the bifurcation of the United Andhra Pradesh in 2014, the Andhra region now known as Andhra Pradesh was left out with 13 district's but was given several tribal-dominated mandals from the Khammam district of the Telangana as part of the Polavaram project. These mandals were added to the East Godavari and West Godavari district's respectively only after the Government of Telangana gave up the protests to not include them into the Andhra Pradesh.

On 26 January 2022, the Government of Andhra Pradesh had proposed 13 new districts by issuing a draft notification under the Andhra Pradesh Districts (Formation) Act, 1974, Section 3(5). After taken into consideration of the objections and suggestions received from the public, the government has published the final notification on 3 April 2022 i.e. with effect on and from 4 April 2022 the newly formed districts came into effect as specified in the schedule. At present there are 26 districts spread across 3 cultural regions Kosta Andhra, Uttarandhra and Rayalaseema.

Timeline 
{|class="wikitable"
|-

|+ style="text-align: left;" | Andhra Pradesh districts by year
|
|
|
|
|

Districts 

 Source: Andhra Pradesh State Portal

See also
List of districts in India

References

External links

 

Andhra Pradesh-related lists
Andhra Pradesh